Whitworth is an Ancient Norman name, located in Whitworth, County Durham.

Andrew Whitworth (born 1981), American football offensive lineman
Armstrong Whitworth, English manufacturing company
Earl Whitworth, extinct English title
George Whitworth (disambiguation)
 George F. Whitworth (1816–1907), American missionary
 George Whitworth (footballer, born 1896) (1896–?), English footballer
 George Whitworth (footballer, born 1927) (1927–2006), English footballer
Jennings B. Whitworth (1908–1960), American college sports coach
Jerry Whitworth (born 1939), US Navy communications specialist convicted of spying for the Soviet Union
John Whitworth (disambiguation)
 John Whitworth (RAF officer) (1912–1974), Royal Air Force pilot
 John Whitworth (musician) (1921–2013), English countertenor, organist, and teacher of music
 John Whitworth (poet) (1945–2019), British poet
Johnny Whitworth, American actor
Joseph Whitworth (1803–1887), English engineer
Judith Whitworth, Australian medical researcher
Kathy Whitworth, American golfer
Porter Whitworth (1827–1892), English major general
R. P. Whitworth (1831–1901), Australian journalist and author
Robert Whitworth (1734–1799), English surveyor and canal engineer
Steve Whitworth, (born 1952) English footballer
Victoria Whitworth (1966–), Anglo-Scots writer, archaeologist and art historian
Wallis Whitworth (1855–1927), first director of Birmingham Museum and Art Gallery
Wilfred Whitworth, English rugby league footballer of the 1930s and 1940s
William Whitworth (disambiguation)

References

English-language surnames